Sultan Abdul Jalil Karamatullah Nasiruddin Mukhataram Shah Ibni Almarhum Sultan Idris Murshidul Azzam Shah Rahmatullah KCMG (23 April 1868 – 26 October 1918) was the 29th Sultan of Perak. During that period, Perak was part of the Federated Malay States.

Life

Born on 23 April 1868, he is eldest son of Sultan Idris Murshidul Azzam Shah ibni al-Marhum Raja Bendahara Alang Iskandar Teja, Sultan and Yang di-Pertuan of the State of Perak, GCMG, GCVO, by his first wife, Raja Nuteh Aishah binti Almarhum Sultan Yusuf Sharifuddin Muzaffar Shah Ghafirullah, daughter of Sultan Yusuf Sharifuddin Muzaffar Shah Ghafirullah ibni Almarhum Sultan Abdullah Muhammad Shah.

Reign 
Raja Abdul Jalil ascended to the Perak throne in 1916 following the death of his father Sultan Idris Murshidul Azzam Shah Ibni Almarhum Raja Bendahara Alang Iskandar Teja.

Death

Sultan Abdul Jalil's reign was somewhat brief and lasted only 2 years and 10 months. He died on 26 October 1918 at age 50 and was interred next to his late father at the Al-Ghufran Royal Mausoleum in Bukit Chandan. Almarhum was conferred the posthumous title of Marhum Radziallah. He was succeeded by his half-brother, Sultan Iskandar Shah Ibni Almarhum Sultan Idris Murshidul Azzam Shah Rahmatullah.

Legacy
The Sultan Abdul Jalil Shah Bridge which crosses the Perak River at Kuala Kangsar is named in his honour.

Sultan Abdul Jalil Shah Campus (KSAJS), Sultan Idris Education University at Tanjong Malim is also named in his honour.

1869 births
1918 deaths
Sultans of Perak
Honorary Knights Commander of the Order of St Michael and St George
19th-century monarchs in Asia